Criminal Justice: Behind Closed Doors is an Indian Hindi-language legal drama web series for Hotstar Specials written by Apurva Asrani and directed by Rohan Sippy and Arjun Mukerjee. The series stars Pankaj Tripathi, Kirti Kulhari, Jisshu Sengupta and Khushboo Atre, and was released through Disney+ Hotstar on 24 December 2020.

Cast 
 Pankaj Tripathi as Madhav Mishra, Advocate
 Jisshu Sengupta as Bikram Chandra, popular advocate, victim 
 Deepti Naval as Vijaya (Vijji) Chandra, mother of Bikram Chandra 
 Kirti Kulhari as Anuradha Chandra, Bikram Chandra's Wife 
 Anupriya Goenka as Nikhat Hussain, Mandira's former assistant
 Mita Vashisht  as Mandira Mathur, Corporate Lawyer 
 Ashish Vidyarthi as Dipen Prabhu, Public Prosecutor
 Ayaz Khan as Dr. Moksh Singhvi 
 Shilpa Shukla as Ishani Nath
 Padma Damodaran as Justice Alka Sharma
 Adrija Sinha as Rhea Chandra, Anu & Bikram's Daughter
 Khushboo Atre as Ratna Mishra, Madhav Mishra's wife 
 Nilofar Gheshwat as Pushpa
 Ajeet Singh Palawat as Sub-Inspector Harsh Pradhan
 Kalyanee Mulay as Asst. Sub-Inspector Gauri Pradhan; also Harsh's wife

Episodes

Production

Development 
On 12 February 2020, Sameer Nair, CEO of Aditya Birla Group's content studio Applause Entertainment and BBC Studios India, announced for the sequel of Criminal Justice, which will be adapted from the second season of the 2008 British original series. Sameer Gogate, business head of production at BBC Studios India said "The success of season one has shown what good content can achieve, and we hope the second season will be equally loved by the audiences." While Pankaj Tripathi, Anupriya Goenka and Mita Vashisht were reported to reprise their roles from the first season, the makers did not reveal about the new cast and crew, including the director.

In April 2020, the makers announced that Kirti Kulhari will appear in the new season, with Apurva Asrani roped in as the screenwriter and Rohan Sippy and Arjun Mukherjee were roped in to helm the series. On 3 December 2020, the makers announced the new title as Criminal Justice: Behind Closed Doors.

Filming
Principal shooting of the series took place in March 2020, but was immediately stopped due to the COVID-19 pandemic lockdown in India. The shoot was resumed in July 2020, with the makers following the safety guidelines imposed by the government in order to curb COVID-19 spread. The entire season is shot at three locations spanning over 60-70 working days. Shooting of the series was completed in September 2020.

Release 
The series was initially scheduled for a release in November 2020, before being postponed to December. On 8 December 2020, the makers unveiled character posters of the series, with the trailer being unveiled on 10 December 2020. The series released on Disney+ Hotstar on 24 December 2020 in Hindi, Tamil, Telugu, Malayalam, Kannada, Bengali and Marathi languages.

Reception 
Ektaa Malik, writing for The Indian Express gave three out of five and said, "Criminal Justice: Behind Closed Doors is a gripping morality tale, that is not to be missed". Divyanshi Sharma of India Today, gave three-and-a-half out of five and stated, "Criminal Justice is an important show, if not the most perfect one. And with every episode ending at a point where you want to know what happens next, it comes across as a successful thriller. The show ends on a bittersweet note, reminding us that no matter how much it rains, the sun will always shine." Saibal Chatterjee of NDTV gave three-and-a-half out of five and said, "As a legal drama, Criminal Justice S2 is pretty close to being top-notch. But it is its sharp-eyed exploration of women seeking equality in life and at work that elevates the series to a higher plane". Tatsam Mukherjee from Firstpost stated "Criminal Justice: Behind Closed Doors flirts with the notorious brand of 'realistic' that traverses the line of exploitative and vulgar." Nandini Ramnath from Scroll.in wrote " Kirti Kulhari’s heartrending performance is especially laudable considering her frustrating passiveness for the part. By reserving Anu’s transformation until the very end, the series reveals how hard it is for women to publicly admit to violence."

Sequel 
Further information: Criminal Justice: Adhura Sach

The third installment was released on 26th August 2022 with Pankaj Tripathi and Shweta Basu Prasad in the lead roles. Pankaj Tripathi and Khushboo Atre would be reprising their roles from previous 2 seasons, whereas Purab Kohli, Swastika Mukherjee, Adinath Kothare, Kalyanee Mulay, Aaditya Gupta, Deshna Dugad and Aatm Prakash Mishra are new addition to the cast.

References

External links 
 

Hindi-language Disney+ Hotstar original programming
2020 Indian television series debuts
Indian drama television series
Indian legal television series
Hindi-language television shows
Indian television series based on British television series
Television shows set in Mumbai
Television series by BBC Studios